Chasing the Sun is an album recorded by American saxophonist Ken McIntyre in 1978 for the SteepleChase label.

Reception

Allmusic awarded the album 4 stars.

Track listing
All compositions by Ken McIntyre
 "I Close My Eyes" - 6:25
 "Coconut Bread" - 7:00
 "El Hajj Malik" - 5:30
 "Puddin'" - 6:00
 "Got My Mind Set on Freedom" - 5:10
 "High Noon" - 4:23
 "Chasing the Sun" - 3:45

Personnel 
Ken McIntyre - alto saxophone, flute, bassoon, oboe, bass clarinet
Hakim Jami - bass
Beaver Harris - drums

References 

1979 albums
Makanda Ken McIntyre albums
SteepleChase Records albums